Mulu Airport  is an airport in the state of Sarawak in Malaysia and a gateway to the Gunung Mulu National Park. There are resort accommodations at the National Park, but the nearest villages are Long Terawan, downstream  to the west, and Long Atip  to the south. Rumah Bawang Grang in Brunei is only  to the north-northwest, but there is no road connected to the airport.

Airlines and destinations

Traffic and statistics

See also

 List of airports in Malaysia

References

External links
Short Take-Off and Landing Airports (STOL) at Malaysia Airports Holdings Berhad

Airports in Sarawak